In mathematics, the term “graded” has a number of meanings, mostly related:

In abstract algebra, it refers to a family of concepts:
 An algebraic structure is said to be doubly graded if the index set is a direct product of sets; the pairs may be called "bidegrees" (e.g. see Spectral sequence).
 A -graded vector space or graded linear space is thus a vector space with a decomposition into a direct sum  of spaces.
 A graded linear map is a map between graded vector spaces respecting their gradations.
 A graded module is left module  over a graded ring that is a direct sum  of modules satisfying .
 A differential graded module, differential graded -module or DG-module is a graded module  with a differential  making  a chain complex, i.e.  .
 A graded algebra is an algebra  over a ring  that is graded as a ring; if  is graded we also require .
 The graded Leibniz rule for a map  on a graded algebra  specifies that .
 A differential graded algebra, DG-algebra or DGAlgebra is a graded algebra that is a differential graded module whose differential obeys the graded Leibniz rule.
 A homogeneous derivation on a graded algebra A is a homogeneous linear map of grade d = |D| on A such that  acting on homogeneous elements of A.
 A graded derivation  is a sum of homogeneous derivations with the same .
 A DGA is an augmented DG-algebra, or differential graded augmented algebra, (see Differential graded algebra).
 A superalgebra is a -graded algebra.
 CDGA may refer to the category of augmented differential graded commutative algebras.
 A graded Lie algebra is a Lie algebra that is graded as a vector space by a gradation compatible with its Lie bracket.
 A graded Lie superalgebra is a graded Lie algebra with the requirement for anticommutativity of its Lie bracket relaxed.
 A supergraded Lie superalgebra is a graded Lie superalgebra with an additional super -gradation.
 A differential graded Lie algebra is a graded vector space over a field of characteristic zero together with a bilinear map  and a differential  satisfying  for any homogeneous elements x, y in L, the “graded Jacobi identity” and the graded Leibniz rule.
 The Graded Brauer group is a synonym for the Brauer–Wall group  classifying finite-dimensional graded central division algebras over the field F.
 An -graded category for a category  is a category  together with a functor .
 A differential graded category or  DG category is a category whose morphism sets form differential graded -modules.
 Graded manifold – extension of the manifold concept based on ideas coming from supersymmetry and supercommutative algebra, including sections on
 Graded function
 Graded vector fields
 Graded exterior forms
 Graded differential geometry
 Graded differential calculus

In other areas of mathematics:
 Functionally graded elements are used in finite element analysis.

Linear algebra
Differential operators